The Coen brothers, a sibling duo of filmmakers, are known for their frequent collaborations with various actors and film crew members. Though they write and direct as a team, for many of their films they split the credits, with Joel Coen as director and Ethan Coen as producer, and the two credited jointly as writers.

Recurring cast members

Like most directors, the Coens have frequently cast certain actors in their films. The brothers have most frequently worked with Frances McDormand (9 films); Steve Buscemi and John Goodman (7 films each); Jon Polito and Stephen Root (5 films each); and John Turturro, George Clooney, Bruce Campbell, and Warren Keith (4 films each). They have also worked three times with Michael Badalucco, Richard Jenkins, J.K. Simmons, and Josh Brolin, and twice each with Jeff Bridges, Billy Bob Thornton, Scarlett Johansson, Tilda Swinton, Tim Blake Nelson, John Mahoney, Elizabeth Marvel, Tony Shalhoub, Peter Stormare, M. Emmet Walsh, Ralph Ineson, Jefferson Mays, Harry Melling, Clancy Brown, and Brendan Gleeson.

Recurring crew members
The Coens similarly tend to collaborate with certain filmmakers as well, especially Roger Deakins, Jess Gonchor, Skip Lievsay, and Mary Zophres. They used cinematographer Barry Sonnenfeld on their first three films, through Miller's Crossing, until Sonnenfeld left to pursue his own directing career. Deakins has been the Coen brothers' cinematographer for all their subsequent films except Burn After Reading, on which they employed Emmanuel Lubezki, and Inside Llewyn Davis and The Ballad of Buster Scruggs, on which they employed Bruno Delbonnel.

Sam Raimi is another frequent collaborator. He helped write The Hudsucker Proxy, which the Coen brothers directed, and the Coen brothers helped write Crimewave, which Raimi directed. Raimi took tips about filming A Simple Plan (1998) from the Coen brothers, who had recently finished Fargo. (Both films are set in blindingly white snow, which reflects much light and can make metering for a correct exposure tricky). Raimi has cameo appearances in Miller's Crossing and The Hudsucker Proxy. Raimi and the Coens met when Raimi directed The Evil Dead (1981), for which Joel was hired as an assistant editor.

Carter Burwell has scored all of the Coens' films, aside from Crimewave (1985), although T Bone Burnett produced much of the traditional music in O Brother, Where Art Thou? and The Ladykillers, and was in charge of archive music for The Big Lebowski. Skip Lievsay handles the sound editing for all of the Coens' films.

Most of the Coens' films have been credited to the editor "Roderick Jaynes", an alias which refers collectively to the two Coen brothers. Tricia Cooke, Ethan's wife, was also an editor on three of their films (The Big Lebowski, O Brother, Where Art Thou?, and The Man Who Wasn't There) after working as assistant editor on four of their earlier films (Miller's Crossing, Barton Fink, The Hudsucker Proxy, and Fargo). Michael R. Miller edited Raising Arizona and Miller's Crossing.

References

External links

Coen Brothers
Coen Brothers